Jo Ann Harris (born Jo Ann Marcovitch; May 27, 1949) is an American actress known for her many film and television roles beginning in 1967. In the 1971 film The Beguiled she portrayed a 17-year-old who seduced Clint Eastwood's character. Her other films include Maryjane (1968), The Gay Deceivers (1969), The Sporting Club (1971), The Parallax View (1974), Act of Vengeance (1974), Cruise into Terror (1978), and Deadly Games (1982).

Career
Harris's first acting role came in the drama series Run for Your Life (starring Ben Gazzara) in 1967 when she was 18 years old. Other guest-starring TV credits include Adam-12; Gunsmoke; The High Chaparral; The Virginian/The Men of Shiloh; Medical Center; Walt Disney's Wonderful World of Color; The Mod Squad; The F.B.I.; Barnaby Jones;  Hawaii Five-O; Nakia; The Streets of San Francisco; The Love Boat; Fantasy Island; Vega$; B.J. and the Bear; Rich Man, Poor Man; Laverne & Shirley; and State of the Union.  She was also a panelist on Match Game 77 for a week.

She played a co-starring role in the short-lived 1977 series Most Wanted (starring Robert Stack).

Her voice acting work includes the voice of Tina in the 1973 Hanna-Barbera animated series Goober and the Ghost Chasers, the animated film Oliver & Company (1988), and various episodic characters in The Simpsons.

She played Candy Cantwell, the interviewer, and Terri in eight 2008-2010 episodes of the show State of the Union.

Personal life

Jo Ann Harris was married for many years to television and film writer/producer Jerry Belson. They had two children together, Julie and Willi. Harris was widowed when Belson died in 2006.

Filmography

References

External links
 

1949 births
Living people
American television actresses
American voice actresses
American film actresses
Actresses from Los Angeles
21st-century American women